UV-B lamps are lamps that emit a spectrum of ultraviolet light with wavelengths ranging from 290–320 nanometers. This spectrum is also commonly called the biological spectrum due to the human body's sensitivity to light of such a wavelength. UV-B light does not tan the skin very much, compared to the UV-A lamps that are used in tanning beds.

Treating skin diseases
The main diseases that are treated with UV-B lamps are vitiligo, psoriasis, lichen planus and atopic dermatitis (eczema). vitiligo (loss of skin color) and some other skin diseases.

There are thousands of dermatology clinics around the world that treat skin ailments with UV-B lamps. Many people who suffer from psoriasis or other skin diseases have their own UV-B lamp for home treatment. A small lamp is used to treat limited areas of the skin, while full body cabins are available in clinics and hospitals.

Overexposure to UV-B light can burn the skin, so the exposure time must be regulated by a timer that turns off the lamp.

Increasing vitamin D3
When the skin is exposed to UVB light of 290-300 nanometer, it creates vitamin D3.

The sun rays include low amount of light at 290-300 nanometer, but since the skin does not need much, 15 –30 minutes of sunshine every day is usually considered enough. In Northern European countries especially in the winter when sunlight is scarce, pregnant women may receive UVB light in clinics to assure that their babies have an adequate amount of vitamin D3 when born.

Animals need UV-B light to produce vitamin D3 and strong bones. There are UVB lamps for reptiles, snakes, turtles and other animals in zoos and at the owner's houses.

Cancer risks
UV-B treatments for treating skin diseases (psoriasis, vitiligo, atopic dermatitis, etc.) are given in a very low dosage. The treatments take only few minutes, or less than a minute when the lamp is 290-300 nanometer.

The average dose for 295 nm is 0.1 Joules per square centimeter.
The average dose of broadband UV-B 306 nm is 0.5 Joules per square centimeter.
The average dose for narrowband UV-B 312 nm is 3 Joules per square centimeter.

This low dosage does not increase the risk of skin cancer and UV-B phototherapy remains a very safe treatment. Research citing ten years of experience with phototherapy in Yonsei Medical Center has not revealed any cases of malignancy in the skin.

Too much UV ultraviolet radiation of an undesirable wavelength may lead to direct DNA damage, sunburn, and skin cancer. In contrast to exposure to UV-B light given at low dosage, it was found that UV-A light increases the risk of skin cancer because of the problematic wavelength and because it is given in a much higher dosage.

References

Types of lamp
Light therapy